Mesías Maiguashca (born 24 December 1938) is an Ecuadorian composer and an advocate of Neue Musik (New Music), especially electroacoustic music.

Biography
Born in Quito, Maiguashca studied music at the Conservatorio Nacional de Quito, at the Eastman School of Music in Rochester, New York (1958–65), with Alberto Ginastera at the Instituto di Tella in Buenos Aires, and at the Hochschule für Musik in Cologne. In 1965–66 he returned to Quito to teach at the National Conservatory, but then moved back to Germany to attend the Internationale Ferienkurse für Neue Musik in Darmstadt, and the Fourth Cologne Courses for New Music in 1966–67 where he studied with Karlheinz Stockhausen. He is regarded as one of the central figures of the Cologne School, active since the mid-1970s.

Maiguashca worked closely with Stockhausen in the Electronic Music Studio of the Westdeutscher Rundfunk in Cologne from 1968 to 1972, and joined Stockhausen's ensemble for performances at the German Pavilion at Expo '70 in Osaka. He also prepared the recording of the collective composition Ensemble, organized by Stockhausen for the Darmstadt Courses in 1967. In 1971 he became a founding member of the Oeldorf Group of composers and performers, as well as beginning work at the Centre Européen pour la Recherche Musicale in Metz, at IRCAM in Paris, and at the ZKM, Zentrum für Kunst und Medientechnologie in Karlsruhe. He has taught in Metz, Stuttgart, Basel, Quito, and Győr, amongst other places. From 1990 to 2004 he was Professor of Electronic Music at the Musikhochschule of Freiburg im Breisgau, the town where he has lived since 1996.

Works

Compositions
Iridiscente, for orchestra, sound objects & electroacoustics,  2009
Ton-Geographie IV for sound installation, violin, cello, flute, trombone & sound objects, 2007
Boletín y elegía de las Mitas, scenic cantata  on the text by César Dávila Andrade, 2006–2007
El Tiempo for 2 flutes, 2 clarinets, 2 cellos, 2 percussionists & electronics, 1999–2000
mini-ópera Los Enemigos, premiered: 31 October 1997 Karlsruhe, Germany.
The Spirit Catcher for cello & live electronics, 1993
La Seconde Ajouteé for 2 pianos. 1985
Fmelodies II for cello, percussion & tape, 1984
 ...y ahora vamos por aquí... for 8 instruments & tape, 1977
 ÜBUNGEN  for violin & synthesizer, 1972
 AYAYAYAYAY concrete music & electroacoustics, 1971
Note: for a complete catalogue refer to the composer's website.

Writings
Maiguashca, Mesias. 1975. "Information zu Übungen für Violine, Klarinette und Violoncello." Feedback Papers 9 (Summer): 228–32.
Maiguashca, Mesias. 1985. "Zu FMELODIES" Neuland Jahrbuch 5:288–96.
Maiguashca, Mesias. 1987.  "Espectro—armonía—melodía—timbre". Opus Magazine, no. 13 (June, edited by Arturo Rodas and translated by Ramiro Salvador Roldán): 10–19.
Maiguashca, Mesias. 1991. "Spectre—harmonie—mélodie—timbre." In Le timbre, métaphore pour la composition, edited by Jean-Baptiste Barrière, Catherine Delaruelle, and Anne Grange, translated by Esther Starkier and Alain Galliari,  402–11. Paris: Bourgois.

Discography
Computer Music Currents 5 (Wergo 20252):
Mesias Maiguashca, Fmelodies II and works by
J. Harvey, G. Loy, Kaija Saariaho, D. Smalley
Reading Castañeda (Wergo 20532):
Mesias Maiguashca:
The Spirit Catcher, The Tonal, Sacatecas Dance, The Wings of Perception II, El Oro, The Nagual.
FEEDBACK STUDIO KÖLN CD 2:
Mesias Maiguashca, Übungen for violin & Shynth. Other works by D. Johnson,
K. Barlow, S. Foretic, P. Eötvös y John McGuire.
K.O. Studio Freiburg
ORGEL MUSIK UNSERER ZEIT IV:
Zs. Szathmáry spielt Werke from Mesias Maiguashca (Nemos Orgel)
und W. Michel, Zs. Szathmáry, H. Otte, C. Lefebvre.
SurPlus Contemporáneos:
Published by Sumak, Música académica ecuatoriana del Siglo XX
Mesias Maiguashca, La Noche Cíclica and works by
J. Campoverde, P. Freire, A. Rodas, L. Enríquez, E. Flores & M. Estévez.
CCEN del Azuay

References

Sources

Further reading
 Anderson, Julian. 2000. "A Provisional History of Spectral Music". Contemporary Music Review 19, no. 2 ("Spectral Music: History and Techniques"): 7–22.
 Fürst-Heidtmann, Monika. 1993. "Mesias Maiguashca." In Komponisten der Gegenwart: Loseblatt-Lexikon—Nachlieferung 3, edited by Hanns-Werner Heister and Walter-Wolfgang Sparrer. Munich: Edition Text+Kritik.
 Kostakeva, Maria. 2001.  "Die wandelnde Welt oder die Zeitkristalle? "Die Feinde" von Mesias Maiguashca. Musiktheater nach der Erzählung "Das geheime Wunder" von J.-L. Borges." In  Das Musiktheater in den audiovisuellen Medien: "... ersichtlich gewordene Taten der Musik", ed. Peter Csobádi, Gernot Gruber, and Jürgen Kühnel, 526–534. Anif/Salzburg: Mueller-Speiser. .
 Montague, Stephen. 1991. "Mesias Maiguashca." Contemporary Music Review 6, no. 1 ("New Instruments for the Performance of Electronic Music/Live Electronics"): 197–203.
 Müller, Hermann-Christoph. 1999. "Schlafende Schönheit: Musiktheaterstücke von Furukawa, Viñao und Maiguashca im ZKM Karlsruhe." MusikTexte: Zeitschrift für Neue Musik. no. 80 (August): 33–37.

External links
Composer’s homepage (in German)
Mesias Maiguashca at digi-arts, UNESCO

20th-century classical composers
20th-century male musicians
21st-century classical composers
21st-century male musicians
1938 births
Ecuadorian composers
Ecuadorian expatriates in Argentina
Ecuadorian expatriates in France
Ecuadorian expatriates in Germany
Ecuadorian expatriates in Hungary
Ecuadorian expatriates in Switzerland
Ecuadorian expatriates in the United States
Ecuadorian opera composers
Hochschule für Musik und Tanz Köln alumni
Academic staff of the Hochschule für Musik Freiburg
Living people
Male classical composers
Pupils of Karlheinz Stockhausen